Daniel Marc Cohn-Bendit (born 4 April 1945) is a French-German politician of Jewish descent. He was a student leader during the unrest of May 1968 in France and was also known during that time as Dany le Rouge (French for "Danny the Red", because of both his politics and the colour of his hair). He was co-president of the group European Greens–European Free Alliance in the European Parliament. He co-chairs the Spinelli Group, a European parliament inter-group aiming at relaunching the federalist project in Europe. He was a recipient of the European Parliament's European Initiative Prize in 2016. Cohn-Bendit's 1970s writings on sexuality between adults and children later proved controversial in 2001 and 2013.

Selected works
He is the co-author, with his brother Gabriel Cohn-Bendit, of Obsolete Communism: The Left-Wing Alternative (Linksradikalismus: Gewaltkur gegen die Alterskrankheit des Kommunismus, 1968). This book combines an account of the events of May 1968 with a critique of Stalinism, the French Communist Party and the trade union establishment. The authors acknowledged their intellectual debt to the libertarian socialist group Socialisme ou Barbarie, especially Cornelius Castoriadis ("Pierre Chaulieu") and Claude Lefort.

Allegations of sex with minors
In 2001, it was revealed that Cohn-Bendit had authored a 1976 article in the cultural-political magazine das da, in which he graphically described engaging in sexual activities with children under his care at a Frankfurt kindergarten. In 2013, a recording was discovered wherein Cohn-Bendit described an "incredibly erotic game" with a minor.  With regard to the das da article, Cohn-Bendit claimed the described activities were not based on true events and were an "obnoxious provocation".

See also
 Federal Europe
 Pro-Europeanism
 Europe Ecology – The Greens

References

Further reading 

 "Germany Yesterday and Today: A Discussion with Jean-Paul Sartre, Alice Schwarzer and Daniel Cohn-Bendit". Telos 41 (Fall 1979). New York: Telos Press.

External links
 

1945 births
Living people
Federalism
People from Montauban
Anti–Vietnam War activists
Autonomism
20th-century French Jews
French socialists
German socialists
May 1968 events in France
MEPs for Germany 2004–2009
MEPs for Île-de-France 2009–2014
Alliance 90/The Greens MEPs
Europe Ecology – The Greens MEPs
MEPs for France 1999–2004
Europe Ecology – The Greens politicians
Sozialistischer Deutscher Studentenbund members
Eurofederalism
University of Paris alumni